Deep Black: Space Espionage and National Security is a 1986 non-fiction book written by American journalist and author William E. Burrows. The book is promoted with the tagline "The Startling Truth Behind America's Top Secret Spy Satellites" on the covers of the second (first paperback) and subsequent editions.

Synopsis 
Deep Black recounts the United States' clandestine intelligence, surveillance and reconnaissance (ISR) program from its inception at the start of the Cold War up to the mid-1980s. Burrows concentrates on aspects of the program which use technical means of collecting intelligence by employing strategic aircraft, satellites and other electronic techniques instead of more traditional espionage activities. Additionally, the work details how the program adapts from, or is directly related to seminal events of the era such as early Soviet successes in their space program, the Cuban Missile Crisis, the downing of Korean Air Lines Flight 007 and the Space Shuttle Challenger disaster while framing the intragovernmental competition among organizations of the US Intelligence Community (IC) for tax dollars, equipment and influence.

Title 
The title is a reference to the IC jargon term "black", indicating something which is highly classified such as a black budget which is used to finance black ops and/or black projects, all of these are discussed in the book. Thus, "Deep Black" alludes that the subject and the material inside are profoundly sensitive in nature.

Reception 
Foreign Affairs described the book as thick and the information overwhelming, concluding that the piece was germane "to more analytically oriented scholars". 

In The New York Times, John Newhouse gives a generally favorable review of Deep Black while taking nuanced exception to Burrows’ depiction of the Sputnik launch as "the most pernicious problem" of the Eisenhower White House. The review called the book "very revealing... More remarkable than exploits of human spies". 

Stars and Stripes wrote "Deep Black is vital reading for anyone concerned with the national security of the United States".

Carter Page citation 
Carter Page, who served as a foreign-policy adviser to (then candidate) President Donald Trump during his successful 2016 presidential campaign, cited Deep Black while a midshipman at the Naval Academy in a Trident Scholar Program report in 1993. The portion cited by Page discusses emerging technologies from Strategic Defense Initiative research being applied to surveillance systems.

See also 
 Anti-Ballistic Missile Treaty (ABMT)
 Anti-Satellite (ASAT) weapon
 Central Intelligence Agency (CIA)
 Corona (satellite)
 Lockheed U-2
 Missile Defense Alarm System (MIDAS)
 National Photographic Interpretation Center (NPIC)
 National Reconnaissance Office (NRO)
 National Technical Means (NTM) of verification
 National Security Agency (NSA)
 Project Oxcart
 RC-135
 Satellite And Missile Observation System (SAMOS)
 Skunk Works
 Sound Surveillance System (SOSUS)
 Strategic Air Command (SAC)
 The Puzzle Palace
 Treaty on Open Skies

References

External links 

 Deep Black: Space Espionage and National Security at the Library of Congress
 Strategic Defense Initiative Organization (SDIO) Technical Information Management Center Bibliography of Unclassified Books, January 1986 – December 1986 from the Defense Technical Information Center

1986 books
1986 non-fiction books
American non-fiction books
Berkley Books books
Books about foreign relations of the United States
Books about intelligence agencies
Books about the Cold War
Cold War history of the Soviet Union
Cold War history of the United States
Cold War military history of the Soviet Union
Cold War military history of the United States
Military space program of the United States
Non-fiction books about espionage
Non-fiction books about United States intelligence agencies
Random House books
Soviet Union–United States relations
Works about the Cold War